The Texas Rangers 1985 season was the 14th for the franchise in the Dallas-Fort Worth metroplex, and the 25th overall.  The Rangers finished 7th in the American League West with a record of 62 wins and 99 losses, 28½ games behind the eventual AL and World Series Champion Kansas City Royals.

Offseason
 November 7, 1984: Dave Hostetler was traded by the Rangers to the Montreal Expos for Chris Welsh.
 November 26, 1984: Marv Foley was released by the Rangers.
 January 3, 1985: Rafael Bournigal was drafted by the Rangers in the 11th round of the 1985 Major League Baseball draft, but did not sign.
 January 18, 1985: Danny Darwin and a player to be named later were traded by the Rangers to the Milwaukee Brewers as part of a 4-team trade. The Kansas City Royals sent Don Slaught to the Rangers. The Brewers sent Jim Sundberg to the Royals. The New York Mets sent Tim Leary to the Brewers. The Royals sent Frank Wills to the Mets. The Rangers completed the deal by sending Bill Nance (minors) to the Brewers on January 30.
 February 13, 1985: Greg A. Harris was purchased by the Texas Rangers from the San Diego Padres.
 February 27, 1985: Billy Sample and a player to be named later were traded by the Rangers to the New York Yankees for Toby Harrah. The Rangers completed the deal by sending Eric Dersin (minors) to the Yankees on July 14.

Regular season
 April 29, 1985 – Larry Parrish hit three home runs in a game against the New York Yankees.
 Charlie Hough finished second in the American League with 14 Complete Games.

Notable transactions
 April 6, 1985: Randy Asadoor was traded by the Rangers to the San Diego Padres for Mitch Williams.
 April 6, 1985: Daryl Smith was released by the Rangers.
 May 17, 1985: Geno Petralli was signed as a free agent by the Rangers.
 July 10, 1985: Ellis Valentine was signed as a free agent by the Rangers.
 July 30, 1985: Sammy Sosa was signed by the Rangers as an amateur free agent.
 August 28, 1985: The Rangers traded Cliff Johnson to the Toronto Blue Jays for players to be named later. The Blue Jays completed the deal by sending Matt Williams and Jeff Mays (minors) to the Rangers on August 29, and Greg Ferlenda (minors) to the Rangers on November 14.
 September 13, 1985: Dave Stewart was traded by the Rangers to the Philadelphia Phillies for Rick Surhoff.

Opening Day starters
 Buddy Bell
 Toby Harrah
 Cliff Johnson
 Pete O'Brien
 Larry Parrish
 Don Slaught
 Frank Tanana
 Gary Ward
 Curtis Wilkerson
 George Wright

Season standings

Record vs. opponents

Roster

Player stats

Batting

Starters by position
Note: Pos = Position; G = Games played; AB = At bats; H = Hits; Avg. = Batting average; HR = Home runs; RBI = Runs batted in

Other batters
Note: G = Games played; AB = At bats; H = Hits; Avg. = Batting average; HR = Home runs; RBI = Runs batted in

Pitching

Starting pitchers
Note: G = Games pitched; IP = Innings pitched; W = Wins; L = Losses; ERA = Earned run average; SO = Strikeouts

Other pitchers
Note: G = Games pitched; IP = Innings pitched; W = Wins; L = Losses; ERA = Earned run average; SO = Strikeouts

Relief pitchers
Note: G = Games pitched; IP = Innings pitched; W = Wins; L = Losses; SV = Saves; ERA = Earned run average; SO = Strikeouts

Awards and honors
All-Star Game
 Gary Ward, outfield, reserve

Farm system

Daytona Beach affiliation shared with Baltimore Orioles

References

External links
1985 Texas Rangers at Baseball Reference
1985 Texas Rangers at Baseball Almanac

Texas Rangers seasons
Texas Rang
Texas Rangers